"Wearing the Inside Out" is a song from Pink Floyd's 1994 album, The Division Bell. A collaboration between Richard Wright and Anthony Moore, it is the only song on the album for which David Gilmour receives no writing credit.

The song had the working title "Evrika". Two videos of the band working on this demo version can be seen on the DVD/BD included in The Endless River deluxe edition and as part of the iTunes deluxe edition.

It is the first occasion that Richard Wright provided lead vocals on a song since "Time" and "Us and Them" on the band's 1973 album "The Dark Side of the Moon". In a 1994 interview Rick did with In the Studio host Redbeard for the US premiere of the album, Rick revealed he did the vocal in the first take.

According to bassist and past touring member, Guy Pratt, the song originated from an idea he came up with: a bass riff involving harmonics.

Later performances
This song was never performed live by Pink Floyd, although it was performed on David Gilmour's 2006 On an Island Tour, and appears on the Remember That Night DVD and on the bonus CD of the deluxe version of Live in Gdańsk. On this version, Guy Pratt begins with the aforementioned bass riff.

Personnel
Richard Wright – lead vocals, synthesiser, Hammond organ, piano
David Gilmour – guitar, co-lead and backing vocals
Nick Mason – drums, tambourine

Additional musicians:
Guy Pratt – Bass guitar
Dick Parry – tenor saxophone
Sam Brown – backing vocals
Durga McBroom – backing vocals
Carol Kenyon – backing vocals
Jackie Sheridan – backing vocals
Rebecca Leigh-White – backing vocals

References

1994 songs
Songs about mental health
Pink Floyd songs
Songs written by Richard Wright (musician)
Song recordings produced by Bob Ezrin
Song recordings produced by David Gilmour
Songs written by Anthony Moore